"My All" is a song by American singer-songwriter Mariah Carey from her sixth studio album, Butterfly (1997). It was released as the album's fifth single overall and second commercial single on April 21, 1998, by Columbia Records. The song was written and produced by Carey and Walter Afanasieff. "My All" is built around Latin guitar chord melodies, and makes subtle use of Latin percussion throughout the first chorus, before taking on a more conventional R&B-style beat. Carey was inspired to write the song and use Latin inspired melodies after a trip to Puerto Rico, where she was influenced by the culture. The song's lyrics tell of a lonely woman declaring she would give "her all" to have just one more night with her estranged lover. It is the first song Carey wrote for the Butterfly album.

The music video for the song was released in March 1998. It shows many scenes of Carey laying on a submerged vessel in a large body of water, while lamenting her lost lover. Towards the video's climax, Carey and her love interest climb atop a lighthouse and caress each other under the night's sky. "My All" was performed live on various occasions, including the 1998 World Music Awards and Blockbuster Entertainment Awards, Saturday Night Live, The Rosie O'Donnell Show and various European television and music chart programs. The song was also part of Carey's 1998 Butterfly World Tour, and was performed during many future tours and concerts. House music producer David Morales remixed the song, which was performed live as a medley with the original.

"My All" received acclaim from music critics and charted strongly throughout various music markets. In the United States, the song became Carey's thirteenth chart topper on the Billboard Hot 100, and was certified double-platinum by the Recording Industry Association of America (RIAA). Throughout Europe, the song performed moderately, peaking at number four in the United Kingdom and in the top ten in Belgium (Wallonia), France, Spain and Switzerland. In France, due to strong sales, the song was certified gold by the Syndicat National de l'Édition Phonographique (SNEP).

Background 
Carey began writing and composing themes for Butterfly by the end of 1996. She considered this period in time to be a "redefining moment for herself," as she began making the music she truly loved, R&B and hip hop. Additionally, Carey began incorporating other musical genres into her songwriting, assisting her in developing new ideas and melodies. Carey expressed how the mixed emotions she felt at that point in her life helped develop the song, as she would "pour herself and emotions into anything she was writing at the time." In an interview with Fred Bronson, Carey expressed how a visit to Puerto Rico and the current emotions in her life inspired her to write "My All":
I had gone to Puerto Rico and was influenced by Latin music at that moment. When I came back, the melody was in my head. It was at a melancholy point in my life and the song reflects the yearning that was going on inside of me. It was like being in a situation but you want to break free and you can't, so your confined yet you're releasing those emotion through the lyrics and the actual act of singing. Thats why think a lot of people felt very strongly about that song, because the emotion is clear when you listen to it.
Carey began to infuse her personality into her work, something that showed throughout various tracks. During her stay, she was influenced by the Latin culture, and began harmonizing and singing the music she heard there. When she arrived back to New York, she already had the melody developed, and soon began working on the song in San Francisco with Afanasieff.

In her 2020 memoir, The Meaning of Mariah Carey, Carey revealed how "My All" was also inspired by a secret romantic rendezvous she and baseball player Derek Jeter had during her time in Puerto Rico.

Recording 
Carey and Afanasieff had worked together since her debut album in 1990. Together, they had written some of Carey's biggest hits at the time, including "Hero" and "One Sweet Day." "My All" would be the last time the two would collaborate, as he is absent from the writing credits in her follow-up album, Rainbow (1999). During the recording of the song, Carey and then-husband Tommy Mottola were in the midst of their divorce. Afanasieff, who had developed relationships with the two of them, was caught in the middle. He spoke of the difficulties he had recording "My All" with Carey, as their relationship had already strained during the divorce. Afanasieff had been employed by Mottola and Columbia Records, and had worked extensively with Carey in the studio. In an interview with Fred Bronson, Afanasieff spoke in depth of the personal problems he experienced with Carey in 1997:
I needed to maintain a very strong relationship with Tommy [Mottola]. During that period, the beginning of their end, I had to stay away more than normal from her because she was going through a rough time. She felt that shutting her relationship with Tommy was also a cleansing of who she was. She felt that part of what she was dropping was the shmaltzy pop singer ballad kind of stuff he was adamant about. I had to make my exit and say 'Mariah, you need to redefine yourself, that's fine. I'm here doing what I do and if and when you want to come back and do it again, I'm here.
"My All" was written in Carey's home-studio in upstate New York, and was recorded in Afanasieff's recording studio in San Francisco. After she presented him with the melody she had developed in Puerto Rico, he began playing chords on the piano, while Carey sang the tune and directed him. After they produced the chorus, Carey wrote the lyrics, while he added a drum groove to the basic melody. According to Afanasieff, "My All" had tapped into both their Latin backgrounds. While she hadn't spent much time with her Venezuelan paternal grandfather, Carey said the music was "definitely subconsciously in me." On the other hand, Afanasieff was born in Brazil, and had heard Russian and Brazilian music his whole life. In an interview with Fred Bronson, Afanasieff described the steps they took to record the song:
I remember being in the back part of the studio, and we were sitting there late at night and writing. I was strolling through some sounds and came upon a particular sound from a steel acoustic guitar. I played these really beautiful chord changes that eventually led to 'My All.' She started singing and I started playing, and we came up with the basis for the song. I put a little drum groove down and it was one of the easier songs to write with her.

Composition 

"My All" is a slow-tempo ballad, that blends contemporary R&B beats and Latin guitar and chord melodies, making subtle use of Latin percussion in the first chorus. The song is described as having a "lush sound" and featured synthetic guitar arpeggios that were produced in the studio. "My All" was compared to Toni Braxton's music style, described as "slink, slow-jam R&B sounds." The song is set in signature common time and written in the key of G minor. It features a basic chord progression of Gm-Cm-D7-Gm. Carey's vocal range in the song spans from the low note of B2 to the high note of F5, with the piano and guitar pieces range from G3 to G5. The track was very different than anything Carey had ever recorded, incorporating strong "Latin cultured background." The instrumentation and vocal arrangement used in the song was compared to Kenneth "Babyface" Edmonds' productions, due to its "soft R&B coos and guitar melodies."

Critical reception 

"My All" received acclaim from music critics. Stephen Thomas Erlewine from AllMusic chose the song as one of the three "track choices" from the album. Daryl Easlea for BBC said it "encapsulates her more traditional, straight ballad approach with Latin overtones." Larry Flick from Billboard praised the song, calling it an "anthemic gem." He also described it as "sparkling with a house flavor that's mildly reminiscent of Toni Braxton's landmark 'Un-break My Heart'." While reviewing the album, Flick also reviewed the Morales remix, writing "Morales straddles the fence between underground aggression and pop-radio fluff with deceptive ease, crafting a track anchored with a muscular bassline and embellished with vibrant synths. It's 10 minutes of pure disco bliss." David Browne from Entertainment Weekly praised the song's instrumentation, noting "with its gently plucked guitars, is the best Babyface track Babyface never produced." Another editor, Mark Bautz, felt it stand up as one of "the best pop tunes of the '90s." In 2018, the magazine described it as a "let-the-candles-burn" ballad "put through a slow-burn flamenco filter and zhuzhed up with some serious sensuality and Spanish guitar." A reviewer from The Hartford Courant wrote that Carey's voice "flows like molasses, accompanied by a lead guitar in the sexy "My All"." Virginian Pilot declared the song as a "lush pop ballad" that has been "tailor-made" for Carey. Richard Harrington from The Washington Post felt it's "another yearning ballad with Babyface-style romantic extremism".

Chart performance 
Although "My All" was the fifth single released from Butterfly, it was only the second commercial worldwide release. The song debuted at number two on the US Billboard Hot 100 chart behind Next's "Too Close" with 21 million radio airplay audience impressions and sales of 122,000 units. According to Billboard, the single was "deeply discounted". It eventually became Carey's 13th chart topper in the United States, placing her in fourth place for most number ones in the US. Also, it gave Carey the honor of having the most number ones for a female artist. It stayed atop the Hot 100 for one week, and was certified double-platinum by the Recording Industry Association of America (RIAA), denoting shipments of over two million units. "My All" peaked at number four on the Billboard Hot R&B/Hip-Hop Songs, and eighteen on the Adult Contemporary chart. It finished number seventeen on the Billboard end of year chart, and ninety-nine on the end of decade chart. In Canada, the song entered the Canadian RPM Chart at number 89 during the week of May 18, 1998. In its fifth week, the song peaked at number 28, spending 16 weeks in the chart before exiting the week of August 31.

"My All" performed weakly in Australia, peaking at number 39 while spending only two weeks on the ARIA Top-40. In Belgium (Wallonia), it peaked at number nine, and spent 14 weeks on the Ultratop singles chart. The song performed well in France, peaking at number six and spending 24 weeks fluctuating in the French singles chart. "My All" was certified silver by the Syndicat National de l'Édition Phonographique (SNEP), denoting shipments of 125,000 units throughout France. The song performed moderately in Ireland, peaking at number 21, and spending seven weeks on the Irish Singles Chart. In Norway and Sweden, it peaked at numbers 14 and 15, respectively. The song charted well in Switzerland, spending 21 weeks in the top-100, and peaking at number seven. In the United Kingdom, 'My All" debuted and peaked at number four on the UK Singles Chart on June 13, 1998, the highest new entry of the week. The song spent eight weeks on the singles chart, until the week of August 1, 1998, where it dropped outside the top-100. Sales in the UK are estimated at 160,000 units.

Remixes and other versions 
"My All" features two remixes: the first is a contemporary R&B version titled, "My All/Stay Awhile" (So So Def Remix). Carey re-recorded her vocals for the song, while building it around a sample from the Loose Ends song "Stay a Little While, Child." Carey's vocal interpolation blends the first verse and chorus of "My All" with the verse and chorus of "Stay a Little While, Child." It was produced by Jermaine Dupri and features raps from Lord Tariq and Peter Gunz. The single also features a version without any rap verses. The second remix is a dance version mixed by David Morales. The dance remix is known as the Classic Club Mix; it was Carey's first collaboration with Morales that did not feature entirely new vocals. Consequently, the song is fairly close to the original chord progressions of the album version, though some new vocals were added. The remix was performed live as a medley with the original during many of Carey's live concert tours.

Carey recorded a Spanish version of "My All" titled, "Mi Todo." Unlike with "Hero" (1993) and "Open Arms" (1995), Carey recorded the Spanish version of the song in a different key from the original English version. The first line of the song had been mistranslated and was grammatically incorrect. Carey later mentioned on her website that she would no longer record Spanish versions of her songs until she could verify the correct lyrics and pronunciation.  "Mi Todo" was remixed as well, however only being released as a promotional single in Mexico.

Music videos 
"My All" and the "My All/Stay Awhile" (So So Def Remix) featured different music videos. The video for "My All" was shot entirely in black and white in Puerto Rico, and was directed by fashion photographer Herb Ritts. The video begins with Carey lying on an overturned vessel on a beach, staring into the night sky, lamenting her estranged lover. As the scenes progress, Carey's love interest is seen atop a lighthouse in the middle of the ocean, searching for his lost companion. Further scenes show Carey laying on a large conch shell, wet and vulnerable. Soon after, she begins walking on a path of large white flowers, until she reaches the top of the lighthouse where she is rejoined with her lover. After the song's second verse, Carey and the man begin caressing each other, and embracing atop the lighthouse. After they share an intimate moment, Carey is shown walking back on the trail of white flowers, smiling and happy. The scenes of Carey lying in the shell and in front of the flowers were inspired by Sandro Botticelli's painting The Birth of Venus. According to author Chris Nickson, the snippets of Carey on the overturned vessel showed her vulnerability without her loved one, truly highlighting the yearning emphasized in the song. Sony Music Video released "My All" on VHS on April 21, 1998; it peaked at number six on the US Billboard Music Video Sales chart and sold 6,000 copies by June of that year according to Nielsen SoundScan.

A music video was also filmed for the So So Def remix. Directed by Diane Martel, it was shot in a grainy fashion to simulate a home video. The video features cameo appearances by Dupri, Tariq and Gunz. It begins with scenes of Carey and Dupri at a small in-home gathering, lounging and enjoying each other's company. As the video progresses, the other two featured hip-hop musicians appear at the house, alongside various other guests. They begin to dance to music, while sipping on cocktails by the pool. As the video reaches its climax, scenes of Carey singing in an outdoor garden are shown, while the others join her on the pool deck.

Live performances 

"My All" was performed on several live television appearances, as well as most of Carey's tours following the song's release. Carey first sang "My All" on Saturday Night Live on November 15, 1997. The performance featured guitar player. Later, Carey performed the song at the 1998 World Music Awards, completing both the original and dance remix as a medley. The performance was via-satellite from Carey's tour at the time, which was broadcast onto a large screen. At the Blockbuster Entertainment Awards in 1998, Carey sang the original version of the song, featuring a full orchestra and live backup vocals.

Carey was one of the five featured performers at the 1998 VH1 Divas, where she sang "My All" as well as the dance remix. The song was performed on the British music chart program, Top of the Pops, where a live medley of the original and dance versions were performed. "My All" was performed during Carey's Butterfly World Tour in 1998. For the performances in Japan, Carey featured a Latin guitarist and backing vocals. The guitarist was present during the song's recital throughout the entire tour, replacing the orchestra used during her television appearances. For the shows, Carey wore a beige outfit, with varying hairstyles. Neither remix version was performed during the tour.

For her Rainbow World Tour (2000) Carey performed the original version of the song, once again featuring the orchestra and live female background vocals. 2 years later on December 7, 2002, Carey performed the original version of "My All" in front of a crowd of 50,000 people, at the closing ceremony concert of the Mexican Teletón, which took place in the country's Azteca Stadium. Since the Charmbracelet World Tour in 2004, Carey has not performed the full version of the original, substituting it for the dance remix after the second verse. During the shows in the Adventures of Mimi tour, Carey donned a black bikini and matching cape, while featuring one male and two female background singers. On the Angels Advocate Tour (2010), she performed the original and dance remix versions, wearing a red outfit while performing the song seated. Again, the original and dance remix was performed as a medley, featuring the same backup from the previous tour. After completing the song, Carey was whisked away by a shirtless male dancer, and carried off the stage for a costume change, as the back-up continued into the dance version.

Cover versions 
On February 25, 2014, Alisa Kozhikina, the representative of Russia to the Junior Eurovision Song Contest 2014, won in the Grand Finals of Golos Deti, the Russian kids' edition of The Voice, performing a Russian version of the song called "Vsyo".
In 2020, Australian singer Greg Gould recorded a Spanglish version as a duet with Emily Williams for his album 1998.

Formats and track listings 

 US CD single
 "My All" – 3:51
 "Breakdown" – 4:58

 US CD maxi single /My All/Breakdown EP
 "My All" (Album Version) – 3:51
 "My All" (Classic Club Mix) – 9:06
 "Breakdown" (The Mo Thugs Remix) – 4:58
 "The Roof" (Remix With Mobb Deep) – 5:29
 "Fly Away" (Fly Away Club Mix) – 9:50

 US CD and 12-inch maxi single
 "My All/Stay Awhile" (So So Def Mix With Lord Tariq & Peter Gunz) – 4:33
 "My All/Stay Awhile" (So So Def Mix Without Rap) – 3:46
 "My All" (Morales My Club Mix) – 7:08
 "My All" (Morales Def Club Mix) – 7:16
 "The Roof" (Morales Funky Club Mix) – 8:28

 My All EP
 "My All / Stay Awhile" (So So Def Remix) – 4:45
 "My All / Stay Awhile" (So So Def Remix without Rap) – 3:34
 "My All" (Full Crew Radio Mix) – 3:59
 "My All" (Classic Radio Club Mix) – 4:17
 "My All" (Morales "My" Club Mix) – 7:11
 "My All" (Morales "Def" Club Mix) – 7:17
 "My All" (Morales Classic Club Mix) – 9:15
 "My All" (VH1 Divas Live) – 5:28

 European CD maxi single
 "My All" (Album Version) – 3:51
 "My All" (Morales Classic Radio Mix) – 4:21
 "My All" (Morales Classic Club Mix) – 9:06
 "My All" (Full Crew Main Mix) – 4:40
 "My All" (Full Crew Radio Mix) – 3:57

 US 12-inch single
 "My All" (Classic Club Mix) – 9:06
 "The Roof" (Mobb Deep Mix) – 5:29
 "Breakdown" (The Mo'Thugs Remix) – 4:58
 "Fly Away" (Butterfly Reprise) (Fly Away Club Mix) – 9:50

 European 12-inch single
 "My All" (Classic Club Mix) – 9:06
 "My All" (My Club Mix) – 7:08
 "My All" (Album Version) – 3:51
 "My All" (Classic Radio Club Mix) – 4:15

 Mariah en Español'' EP
 "Héroe" – 4:17
 "El Amor Que Soñé" – 3:29
 "Mi Todo" – 3:51
 "Mi Todo" (Versión Por Una Noche Más) – 3:25
 "Mi Todo" (Versión Mi Fiesta) – 4:30
 "Mi Todo" (Por Una Noche Más En Los Clubs) – 7:04
 "Mi Todo" (Por Una Noche Más Instrumental) – 3:24

 Credits and personnel 
Credits and personnel are adapted from the Butterfly'' liner notes.

Recording
 Recorded at Crave Studios (New York City), WallyWorld (California) and The Hit Factory (New York City)
 Mixed at Crave Studios (New York City)
 Mastered at Gateway Mastering (Portland, Maine)

Management
 Published by Sony/ATV Songs LLC, Rye Songs (BMI)/Sony/ATV Tunes LLC and WallyWorld Music
 All rights administered by Sony/ATV Music Publishing

Personnel

Charts

Weekly charts

Year-end charts

Decade-end charts

Certifications and sales

Release history

See also 
 List of Billboard Hot 100 number-one singles of 1998

References

Further reading 
 
 

1990s ballads
1998 singles
Mariah Carey songs
Billboard Hot 100 number-one singles
Music videos directed by Diane Martel
Pop ballads
Contemporary R&B ballads
Music videos directed by Herb Ritts
Black-and-white music videos
Songs written by Walter Afanasieff
Songs written by Mariah Carey
Song recordings produced by Walter Afanasieff
1997 songs
Columbia Records singles
Sony Music singles
Torch songs
Latin pop songs
Grammy Award for Best Remixed Recording, Non-Classical